Abū Bakr Muḥammad ibn Yaḥyā ibn al-‘Abbās al-Ṣūlī, (born c. 870 Gorgan – died between 941 and 948 Basra) was a Turkic scholar and a court companion of three Abbāsid caliphs: al-Muktafī, his successor al-Muqtadir, and later, al-Rāḍī, whom he also tutored. He was a bibliophile, wrote letters, editor-poet, chronicler, and a shatranj player. His contemporary biographer Isḥāq al-Nadīm tells us he was “of manly bearing.”  He wrote many books, the most famous of which are Kitāb Al-Awrāq and Kitāb al-Shiṭranj.

Life
Abū Bakr al-Ṣūlī was born into an illustrious family of Turkic origin, his great-grandfather was the Turkic prince Sul-takin and his uncle was the poet Ibrahim ibn al-'Abbas as-Suli.
Al-Marzubānī, a principal pupil of al-Ṣūlī, who admired him and copied him in the art of compilation, borrowed much of al-Ṣūlī's material for his Kitāb al-Muwashshaḥ. Abū al-Faraj al-Iṣbahānī made extensive use of his material in his Kitāb al-Aghānī.                          
On Caliph al-Rāḍī's death in 940, al-Ṣūlī fell into disfavour with the new ruler due to his Shi'a sympathies and he died hiding at al-Baṣrah,  for having quoted a passage about ‘Alī , which caused a public scandal.

Chess
Al-Ṣūlī was among a group of tenth-century chess players who wrote books about the game of shaṭranj, i.e. “chess”. 

Al-Ṣūlī's books were:
Kitāb al-Shiṭranj al-Nisḥa al-Awala ‘Chess, the first manuscript’;
Kitāb al-Shiṭranj al-Nisḥa ath-Thānīa Chess, the second manuscript; Book on chess strategy, common chess openings, standard problems in middle game, annotated end games and the first known description of the knight's tour problem.
Sometime between 902 and 908 al-Ṣūlī played and beat the reigning shaṭranj champion, al-Mawardī, at the court of Caliph al-Muktafī, and the Caliph of Baghdad. Al-Mawardī's loss of royal favour was al-Ṣūlī's gain. When al-Muktafī's died, al-Ṣūlī retained the favour of the succeeding rulers, Caliph al-Muqtadir and in turn Caliph al-Radi.
His biographer Ibn Khallikan, (d. 1282), relates that even in his lifetime the phrase "to play like al-Ṣūlī" was to show great skill at shaṭranj. His endgame strategies are still studied. Contemporary biographer mention his skill in blindfold chess. Al-Ṣūlī also taught shaṭranj. Many later European writers based their work on modern chess on al-Suli's work.

Other Chess players/authors in the Group
Al-‘Adlī wrote:
Kitāb al-Shiṭranj ‘Chess’, the first book on chess, and;
Al-Nard, wa Isbābha wa-al-La’ab bīha. 'Al-Nard Its Elements and Play'.
Al-Rāzī was a chess rival of al-‘Adlī and the caliph Al-Mutawakkil attended their matches. He wrote:
Kitāb latīf fī al- Shiṭranj ‘A Delightful Book about Chess.’
Abū al-Faraj Muḥammad ibn ‘Ubayd Allāh al-Lajlāj ("the stammerer"), whom Isḥāq al-Nadīm had met, was his best known pupil. He excelled at chess at the Būyid court of king ‘Aḍud al-Dawlah in Shīrāz, where he died sometime after 970/71 [360 AH]. He wrote:
Manṣūbāt al-Shiṭranj ‘The Stratagems of Chess.’
Ibn al-Uqlīdasī Abū Isḥāq Ibrāhīm ibn Muḥammad ibn Ṣāliḥ, one of the most skilful chess players, who wrote A Collection of the Stratagems of Chess.

Al-Suli's Diamond

Al-Ṣūlī's shaṭranj problem, called "Al-Ṣūlī's Diamond", went unsolved for over a thousand years.
As this is shaṭranj, the "queen" (counsellor) is a very weak piece, able to move only a single square diagonally. It is possible to win in shaṭranj by capturing all pieces except the king, unless the opponent is able to do the same on the next move.

David Hooper and Ken Whyld studied this problem in the mid-1980s but were unable to crack it. It was finally solved by Russian Grandmaster Yuri Averbakh. The solution, starting with 1. Kb4, is given in Hans Ree's "The Human Comedy of Chess", and on the web.

Works

Kitāb Al-Awrāq
Kitāb Al-Awrāq ‘Leaves’ or ‘Folios’;  unfinished  work on the traditions of the caliphs and the poets;  the poems and chronicles of the sons of the caliphs, from al-Saffāḥ to Ibn al-Mu‘tazz (750 -908) and poems of other members of the Banū al-‘Abbās who were neither caliphs nor sons of caliphs in rank.  This included the poetry of ‘Abd Allāh ibn ‘Alī, the poetry of Abū Aḥmad Muḥammad ibn Aḥmad ibn Ismā’īl ibn Ibrāhīm ibn ‘Īsā ibn al-Manṣūr, the poems of members of the family of Abū Ṭālib the descendants of al-Ḥasan and al-Ḥusayn, the descendants of al-‘Abbās ibn ‘Alī, the descendants of ‘Umar ibn ‘Alī, and the descendants of Ja‘far ibn Abī Ṭālib; poems of the descendants of al-Ḥārith ibn ‘Abd al-Muṭṭalib; traditions about, and selected poems by, Ibn Harmah;  traditions about al-Sayyid al-Ḥimyarī, with a selection of his poetry;  traditions about, and selected poems by, Aḥmad ibn Yūsuf; traditions about Sudayf with a selection of his poetry.  Ishaq al-Nadīm speculates that al-Ṣūlī plagiarized al-Marthadī's book on poetry and the poets, as he had seen a copy of his book that had come from al-Ṣūlī's library.
Kitāb Al-Awrāq published in three parts (1934-6, London):
i) Kitāb al-Awrāķ (Section on Contemporary Poets): contains anthologies of poets of the Muḥadathūn (modern poets) and their diwans. Al-Ṣūlī was interested in the lesser known poets.  Al-Mas'ūdī highly esteemed him for his unique recording of people and events. Of the fourteen poets al-Ṣūlī cites, Abān ibn ‘Abdal-Ḥamīd al-Lāḥiķī and Ashja ibn ‘Amr al-Sulamī are the best known. Part of Abān's versification of the Kalīla wa Dimna written for Yaḥyā ibn Khālid al-Barmakī is preserved and published in the edited Arabic edition by James Heyworth-Dunne (1934).

ii) Akhbar al-Rāḍī wa'l-Muttaqī; chronicle covering a thirteen-year period of the reigns of the caliphs al-Rāḍīwhom al-Ṣūlī had tutored and been a close companion ofand al-Muttaqī. It contains many fresh details of their reigns and the literary activities of the court.  Although less famous than the histories of al-Mas'ūdī and Miskawayh, al-Ṣūlī's is an eyewitness-account of the transition to Buyid rule. The position of amir al-umara was created in 936 during al-Radi's caliphate, which devolved some caliphal executive powers to amirs (princes). The Buyid amirs later exerted these powers to establish their independent dynasty within the Caliphate and the Abbāsid's never regained their full power. However, al-Ṣūlī's account makes clear the limits of the devolved powers to the amirs.

iii) Ash’ār Awlād al-Khulafā’ wa-Akhbāruhum; chronicle of the House of al-'Abbās who were poets.

Other Works
Kitāb al-Wazrā The Viziers;
Kitāb al-'Abādah Worship;
Kitāb Adb al-Kātib 'alā al-Haqīqa Training of the Secretary, according to Standard;
Kitāb tafdhīl al-Sinān ‘Superiority of the Aged,’ written for ‘Alī ibn al-Furāt  (855 – 924) surnamed Abū al-Ḥasan; 
Kitāb al-Shāb Youths; 
Kitāb al-Anwā’ Varieties (unfinished);
Kitāb suwāl wa-jawāb Ramaḍān li Ibn al-Munajjim Questions about Answers of Ramaḍān of Ibn al-Munajjim; 
Kitāb Ramaḍān Ramaḍān;
Kitāb al-Shāmal fī ‘Alam al-Qur’ān The Compendium, about knowledge of the Qur’ān (unfinished),
Kitāb Munāqub ‘alā ibn al-Furāt The Virtues of ‘Alī ibn Muḥammad ibn al-Furāt;
Kitāb akhbār Abū Tammām Traditions about Abū Tammām;
Kitāb akhbār al-Jubbā’ī Abū Sa’īd Traditions about al-Jubbā’ī Abū Sa’īd;
Kitāb al-‘Abbās ibn Aḥnaf Al-‘Abbās ibn Aḥnaf and selected poems;
Epistle of Al-‘Abbās ibn Aḥnaf about collecting taxes; 
Kitāb akhbār Abā ‘Amru Ibn al-‘Alā’ Traditions about Abū ‘Amr ibn al-‘Alā’;
Kitāb Al-Gharar Al-Gharar

Dīwāns of Contemporary Poets edited by al-Ṣūlī 
Muḥammad ibn Aḥmad al-Ṣanawbarī
Ibn al-Rūmī;  Ibn al-Rūmī  Alī ibn al-Abbās grandson of George the Greek popular poet of Baghdād.
Abū Tammām;
al-Buḥturī;
Abū Nuwās;
Al-‘Abbās ibn al-Aḥnaf;
‘Alī ibn al-Jahm;
Ibn Ṭabāṭabā;
Ibrāhīm ibn al-‘Abbās al-Ṣūlī;
Sufyān ibn ‘Uyaynah;
Sawwār ibn Abī Sharā‘ah;

Legacy
Others who made use of content from al-Ṣūlī’s works:
Al-Marzubānī, his principal student who adopted his compilation technique, and frequently cites him in his Kitāb al-Muwashshaḥ.
Abū al-Faraj al-Iṣbahānī in his Kitāb al-Aghānī
Al-Mas'ūdī
Hilāl al-Ṣābī
Arīb ibn Sa’d al-Qurṭubī
Abū Hilāl al-‘Askarī
Miskawaihī
‘Alī ibn Ẓāfir al-Azdī
Ibn Ṭiqṭaqā
Al-Suyūṭī

See also

 List of Muslim historians

Notes

References

Bibliography

 Robert Charles Bell (1980). Board and Table Games from Many Civilizations. .

 Leder, S. "al-Suli, Abu Bakr Muhammad." Encyclopaedia of Islam, Second Edition. Edited by: P. Bearman, Th. Bianquis, C.E. Bosworth, E. van Donzel and W.P. Heinrichs. Brill, 2008. Brill Online.

 Murray, H. J. R. (1913). A History of Chess. .

870 births
940s deaths
Year of birth uncertain
Year of death uncertain
10th-century Arabic writers
10th-century historians from the Abbasid Caliphate
10th-century Arabic poets
10th-century Turkic people
Courtiers of the Abbasid Caliphate
Iraqi Turkmen people
History of chess
Iraqi chess players
People from Gorgan
Shatranj players
Amir al-umara of the Abbasid Caliphate